Actinoptera pallidula is a species of tephritid or fruit flies in the genus Actinoptera of the family Tephritidae.

Distribution
Kenya, Uganda.

References

Tephritinae
Insects described in 1957
Diptera of Africa